Glyphostoma aliciae is a species of sea snail, a marine gastropod mollusk in the family Clathurellidae.

Description

Distribution
This marine species occurs along north and east Australia and the Loyalty Islands.

References

External links
 ^Gastropods.com: Etrema (Etrema) aliciae; accessed : 17 August 2011

aliciae
Gastropods described in 1895